Janak Raj Gupta (1936–2015) was an Indian politician, lawyer and social worker. He was a congress leader and a Member of parliament (MP) from Jammu Poonch Assembly Constituency for a record of two times.

Career

Politics
Gupta served as Deputy Speaker, Jammu and Kashmir Legislative Assembly, from 1977 till 1983.

In his previous association with political parties, he served as General Secretary for PCC (I), Jammu and Kashmir. He served as president for DCC(I), Jammu for ten years. He served as Treasurer for PCC(l), J&K. He was also a Member, Executive Committee for CPP(I) in 1990.

Gupta was a member of Legislative Council, Jammu and Kashmir from 1969 till 1975. He was a Member of 8th and 9th Lok Sabha, from 1985 till 1986. He was a member of Legislative Assembly, Jammu and Kashmir from 1977 till 1983. He also served in the same capacity from 1983 till 1985.

For a greater part of his political career, he served as a political advisor to former chief minister Ghulam Nabi Azad.

Committee service
Gupta served in the following capacities:
 Member, Library Committee, Jammu and Kashmir Legislative Assembly
 Chairman, Committee on Estimates 
 Business Advisory Committee and Joint Committee on Railways Bill, 8th Lok Sabha
 Member, Committee on Absence of Members from the Sittings of House, January 19, 1990 
 Consultative Committee, Ministry of Steel and Mines, 1990

Social service
Gupta sought for the social welfare of the Harijans, especially, the less privileged and the homeless people in Jammu and Kashmir villages. He worked with the Red Cross and Cooperative Movements towards bringing succor to the people. He also worked with various social organizations such as Servants of the People Society (SOPS) towards rendering help to the people.  Gupta served as the chairman, F.S.U. J&K State. He also served as the chairman, Bharat Sevak Samaj, J&K State.

Death
Gupta died on September 13, 2015, after suffering a cardiac arrest at Government Medical College, Jammu.

Personal life
Gupta was married to his wife; Uma Gupta. The couple had five children, two sons namely; Vicky Mahajan and Sahil Mahajan and three daughters namely; Saloni Mahajan, Seetu Kohli and Vasundhara.

See also
 List of members of the 8th Lok Sabha
 List of members of the 9th Lok Sabha
 1984 Indian general election in Jammu and Kashmir
 Jammu and Kashmir Legislative Assembly

References

1936 births
2015 deaths
Indian politicians
20th-century Indian people